The Tanzania national under 17 football team represents Tanzania  in youth men's international football and is controlled by the Tanzania Football Federation, the governing body for football in Tanzania, Tanzania's home ground is Benjamin Mkapa National Stadium in Dar-es-Salaam.

History

Players
The current squad were called up for 2021 Africa U-17 of Nations.

Recent results & fixtures
The following is a list of match results from the previous 12 months, as well as any future matches that have been scheduled.
Legend

2019

2021

Competitive records

FIFA U-17 World Cup

Africa U-17 Cup of Nations

CECAFA U-17 Championship

References

External links

African national under-17 association football teams
under-17